Jerome Junction is a ghost town in Yavapai County, Arizona, United States. Established in 1894, the community served as a railroad transfer stop between the town of Prescott and the town of Jerome. It served as a transfer point between the Santa Fe, Prescott and Phoenix Railway (SFP&P) and the narrow-gauge United Verde & Pacific Railway for 25 years. The narrow-gauge line was built precariously on the side of Woodchute Mountain by William A. Clark after he bought the United Verde Copper Company. In 1917 it had a population of 150. When it was replaced by standard-gauge line on the east side of the mountain from Jerome to Clarkdale in 1920, Jerome Junction became a ghost town, and in 1923, the activities of the former town were absorbed by Chino Valley.

The location changed names at least 3 times:
 1895 June 7 – "Junction" post office
 1914 December 23 – Jerome Junction, railway depot and transfer station
 1923 April 11 – Copper Siding, Chino Valley, railroad stop

All that remains today are some foundations and railroad equipment. Wikimap Google map

See also 
 List of ghost towns in Arizona

References

External links 
 Community profile on Ghosttowns.com

Ghost towns in Arizona
Populated places established in 1894
Former populated places in Yavapai County, Arizona